Harriet Morris "Holly" Metcalf (born March 25, 1958) is a six-time USA national/ Olympic team member in women's rowing, who won a gold medal in rowing at the 1984 Summer Olympics for the women's eight.

Background
Metcalf received her B.A. in Music and English from Mount Holyoke College in 1981 and a masters in risk and prevention and a certificate of advanced study in human development and psychology from Harvard University.

Career
Between 1981 and 1987, she won three silver and one bronze World Championship medals. She won an Olympic gold medal in the U.S. women's eight in 1984.  She is currently the founder and executive director of the Row As One Institute, the original purpose of which was to serve masters women rowers. As director of Row As One, she founded G-ROW Boston, a rowing program for girls in the Boston public schools. G-ROW, which also incorporates academics and relationship-building, is now a program of Community Rowing, Inc. She also founded WeCanRow (Women Enduring Cancer Row), a program for women breast cancer survivors. Founded in Boston in 2002, WeCanRow now has chapters around the U.S.  In 2007, Metcalf was hired as head coach for the MIT women's openweight crew.

She was a panelist at the 2003 National Gay and Lesbian Athletics Conference in Cambridge, Massachusetts, on a panel of LGBT Olympians that also included swimmer Mark Tewksbury and high jumper Brian Marshall.

Private life
Metcalf is openly lesbian. Holly now works as a coach for MIT rowing.

References

External links
 MIT Biography
 
 Row As One Institute Biography
 MHC Crew Celebrates Twenty-Five Years on the River
 

1958 births
Living people
American female rowers
Harvard University alumni
Lesbian sportswomen
American LGBT sportspeople
Mount Holyoke College alumni
Rowers at the 1984 Summer Olympics
Medalists at the 1984 Summer Olympics
Olympic gold medalists for the United States in rowing
World Rowing Championships medalists for the United States
Lincoln School (Providence, Rhode Island) alumni
LGBT rowers
21st-century American women